Rinzia longifolia, commonly known as the creeping rinzia, is a plant species of the family Myrtaceae endemic to Western Australia.

It blooms from August to November producing pink-white flowers.

It is found on low rises in the Great Southern region of Western Australia between Cranbrook to Jerramungup where it grows in sandy or clay soils.

References

longifolia
Endemic flora of Western Australia
Myrtales of Australia
Rosids of Western Australia
Vulnerable flora of Australia
Plants described in 1852
Taxa named by Nikolai Turczaninow